Kenneth Dawson (born 27 August 1915, date of death unknown) was a Scottish professional footballer. An inside left, he played in the Football League for Blackpool, but was also on the books of Sheffield United and Falkirk. Dawson is deceased.

References

1915 births
Year of death missing
Sportspeople from Moray
Scottish footballers
Sheffield United F.C. players
Forres Mechanics F.C. players
Blackpool F.C. players
Falkirk F.C. players
Association football forwards
Scottish Football League players
English Football League players